Ravahere is an atoll of the Tuamotu Archipelago in French Polynesia. It is located 53 km northwest of Nengonengo Atoll and it is separated by a 2 km sound from Marokau Atoll, its closest neighbor to the north.

Marokau and Ravahere form a minor subgroup of the Tuamotus known as the Two Groups Islands.

Ravahere Atoll is roughly boomerang-shaped. It measures 20 km in length with a maximum width of 9.5 km. The shallow lagoon has a surface area of 57.5 km2, but there is no pass to enter it.

Ravahere is permanently uninhabited.

History
The first recorded European who sighted the two neighboring atolls of Marokau and Ravahere was Louis Antoine de Bougainville in 1768.

Administration
Ravahere belongs to the commune of Hikueru, which consists of the atolls of Hikueru, Marokau, Ravahere, Reitoru and Tekokota.

Gallery

See also

 Desert island
 List of islands

References

External links

Photos
Atoll list (in French)

Atolls of the Tuamotus
Uninhabited islands of French Polynesia